Andrea Argoli (in Latin, Andreas Argolus) (15 March 1570 – 27 September 1657), born in Tagliacozzo, was an Italian mathematician, astronomer and astrologer. He was one of the most important 17th-century makers of ephemerides, which gave the positions of astronomical objects in the sky at a given time or times.

He was professor of mathematics at the University of Rome La Sapienza, from 1622 to 1627, and then the University of Padua 1632 to 1657. His pupils may have included Placido Titi and Giovanni Battista Seni, astrologer to Wallenstein.

Biography 
Andrea Argoli was born at Tagliacozzo in the Abruzzi in 1570. His father, Ottavio, was a lawyer. He studied medicine, mathematics, and astronomy at Naples and taught mathematics at the Sapienza University of Rome from 1622 to 1627. Having lost his post because of his involvement with astrology, he was obliged to retire to Venice. The Venetian Senate recognizing his learning appointed him to the Chair of Mathematics at Padua in 1632. In 1638, the Venetian Government conferred upon him the title of Knight of the Order of Saint Mark. After recovering from grave illness in 1646, Argoli wore the Franciscan habit for the rest of his life in gratitude. Argoli was a member of the Accademia Galileiana in Padua and of the Accademia degli Incogniti in Venice.  

A versatile scholar, Argoli showed an interest in madicine. He was one of the first scholars in Italy to acclaim Harvey's discovery of blood circulation. The Pandosion sphaericum of 1644, a large-scale geocentric cosmography, includes a remarkable extract from Harvey's De motu cordis and discusses the theories put forth by Walaeus in his Epistolae duae de motu chyli.

Legacy 
Argoli's extensive astronomical ephemerides, based first on the Prutenic Tables (1620-1640) and later on his own tables (1630-1700), which were based on the observations of Tycho Brahe, gave permanence to his reputation. Delambre has bestowed three pages upon Argoli, who, it appears, was well informed about new scientific discoveries, and is aptly described as “one of those laborious men who wrote long works for the use of astronomers, and particularly of those who were also astrologers.” Argoli's ephemerides were used as the basis of Ferdinand Verbiest's calendars. 

As a mathematician Argoli is best remembered for his discovery that logarithms facilitate easy processes, but increase the labor of difficult ones.

Works 
 Tabulæ Primi Mobilis, Rome, 1610.
 Secundorum Mobilium Tabulæ, Padua, 1634.
 Pandosium Sphæricum, Padua, 1644.
 
 
De Diebus Criticis, Padua, 1652; with various smaller works and second editions (all in 4º). a list of which is in Lalande's Bibliographie Astronomique. The Ephemerides were published as follows: from 1621 to 1640, at Rome in 1621; from 1631 to 1680, at Padua in 1638; from 1648 to 1700, at Rome in 1647. Those from 1661 to 1700 were reprinted at Leiden as late as 1677.

References

Further reading

External links

 
 
  

1570 births
1657 deaths
17th-century Italian mathematicians
17th-century Italian astronomers
17th-century Italian jurists
Italian astrologers
17th-century astrologers
Academic staff of the University of Padua
Academic staff of the Sapienza University of Rome